The BMW E41 and P80 series is a family of naturally-aspirated Formula One racing engines, designed and developed by BMW, and introduced in  in partnership with Williams, and continued through , during their partnership with Sauber.

Overview

E41

The BMW E41 was a Formula One V10 engine manufactured by BMW.

BMW was the engine supplier to the Brabham Formula 1 team from 1982 to 1987. The team became world champion in 1983 with the turbocharged in-line four-cylinder BMW M12/13. In addition to Brabham, ATS, Arrows, and Benetton also drove with BMW engines at times. After BMW officially withdrew from Formula 1 in 1988, the engines were used under the name of the US company Megatron until turbo engines were banned in 1989.

However, BMW did not completely abandon the design of Formula 1 engines. Various naturally aspirated 3.5-litre twelve-cylinder engines emerged. A new regulation prescribed ten-cylinder engines with a maximum displacement of 3 liters, which led to the creation of the BMW E41/2. This formed the basis for the BMW E41/4 V10 engine with a cylinder bank angle of 72°.

The BMW E41/4 was first used in the Williams FW22 on BMW's return to Formula One on 12 March 2000 at the Australian Grand Prix in Melbourne. Ralf Schumacher finished third in this race – it was the best F1 entry by an engine manufacturer in over 30 years.

Internally, the engines were given detailed designations: the BMW E41/4 with the number R39-9, for example, underwent nine revisions, with R standing for racing specification. In its last expansion stage, which was used at the end of the 2000 season, the BMW E41/4 produced around 810 hp (596 kW) at 17,500 rpm. In qualifying, the engine reached a maximum speed of 17,800 rpm. In the 2001 Formula 1 season, the engine was replaced by the BMW P80.

Specifications
Designation: E41/4R39-9
Displacement: 3.0 liters (2998 cc)	
Bore × Stroke: 94.0mm × 43.2mm
Valves/cyl.: 4
Cylinder spacing: 107mm
Power @ rpm	Max.: 596 kW (810 hp) @ 17,500 rpm
Torque: 350 N.m. (258 lb-ft)
Year: 2000

P80 series
The BMW P80 series is a naturally aspirated Formula One V10 engine produced by BMW.

BMW had been the engine supplier to the Williams F1 team since 2000. The BMW E41/4 engine at that time was a V10 engine with a cylinder bank angle of 72°.

The P80 engine developed by BMW for the 2002 Formula 1 season was used in the Williams FW24 Formula 1 racing car and, like its predecessor, the BMW P80, had a cylinder bank angle of 90°. The displacement was identical with 2998 cc. 

The conception of the P82 was started by a team of fewer than 20 employees in January/February 2001. At that time the P80 had not even made its racing debut. The design phase followed from March to June 2001, and testing of the components began in August. On September 21, 2001, the engine, which consists of a total of almost 5,000 individual parts, ran on the test bench for the first time, and on October 3 it was tested in driving operation for the first time.

When asked about the performance data, the BMW Motorsport Director at the time, Mario Theissen, replied: "Told values such as 19,000 rpm and 900 hp are pure speculation."

In the 2003 Formula 1 season, the engine was replaced by the P83; followed by the P84, and its evolution, the P84/5, in 2004 and 2005.

Background

Williams (2000–2005)

After a ten-year absence from Formula One, BMW began evaluating a return to the sport in the late 1990s. In , the marque signed a contract to supply the Williams team with engines. As BMW spent 18 months building and testing a normally aspirated, three-litre V10 engine to comply with technical regulations that had changed significantly since the 1980s, the team used old Renault engines rebadged as first Mecachrome and then Supertec.

BMW's E41 engine was ready to compete in the 2000 season, fitted in the FW22 and driven by Ralf Schumacher and Jenson Button. Schumacher scored a podium finish in the engine's first race, and added two more during the course of the season. A series of consistent points-scoring finishes meant that Williams finished a competitive third in the Constructors' Championship, some distance behind the dominant Ferrari and McLaren teams, but ahead of engine manufacturers with more recent experience.

The engine immediately proved to have a significant power improvement, and propelled Schumacher and new teammate Juan Pablo Montoya into contention for race victories. In all, the two drivers scored four race wins, but lost other opportunities through unreliability and racing incidents. The FW23 chassis also lacked the ultimate downforce to compete with the Ferrari and McLaren drivers at every circuit, although it was the class of the field at "power circuits" such as Hockenheim and Monza.

For , the reliability and consistency of the FW24 chassis was much improved, but Ferrari made a more significant step forward with its own F2002 chassis and dominated both championships. The team scored twelve more points than in the previous year and beat McLaren to second place in the Constructors' Championship, but only won a single race with Schumacher at the Malaysian Grand Prix. Moreover, Montoya was unable to win a single race, despite taking seven pole positions.

However, he ultimately fell short, as did the team in the Constructors' Championship, as although the FW25 was often the car to beat in the second half of the season, it took too much time to reach this point.

For , the team produced the FW26 chassis, which featured a radical nose section designed by Antonia Terzi. This design proved ineffective, however, in another year of Ferrari dominance, and Williams slipped to fourth in the Constructors' Championship, with Montoya's victory in the Brazilian Grand Prix its sole win in the 2004 season. Before this result, the team had suffered the embarrassment of a double disqualification from the Canadian Grand Prix due to brake duct irregularities, and then Schumacher sustaining spinal injuries as a result of a high-speed crash at the United States Grand Prix, which caused him to miss six races until he recovered. Both drivers left the team at the end of the season.

The final year of BMW's association with Williams, saw the team's decline in competitiveness continue, dropping to fifth in the Constructors' Championship. None of the team's three drivers—Mark Webber, Nick Heidfeld and Antônio Pizzonia—were able to win a race; the team's best result was a double podium finish at the Monaco Grand Prix. By this time, the team's relationship with its engine supplier had deteriorated, with BMW believing that its engines were capable of winning championships but were being let down by the Williams chassis they were powering.

BMW Sauber (2006–2009)

BMW bought Swiss team Sauber in June 2005 to form the BMW Sauber F1 Team. The takeover came after BMW's relationship with Williams had deteriorated in the previous months, the partnership ending at the end of the  season. The team, operated under a German racing licence, was based at Sauber's headquarters in Hinwil, Switzerland and BMW's headquarters in Munich, Germany.

The team scored two podium finishes and came fifth in 2006, its first season in Formula One. This was followed by a second place in 2007 after the McLaren team had been excluded from the championship. Robert Kubica took the team's only Grand Prix victory at the 2008 Canadian Grand Prix. Following a poor  season, BMW withdrew from Formula One and sold the team back to founder Peter Sauber.

2006
For the 2006 season, BMW Sauber signed Nick Heidfeld from Williams to be the lead driver, while  World Champion Jacques Villeneuve had his existing two-year contract with Sauber honoured. Robert Kubica was signed as the team's third driver. The team continued to use Sauber's facilities, mostly for chassis construction and wind tunnel testing, while BMW's headquarters in Munich was responsible for building the new 2.4-litre P86 V8 engine, revised technical regulations forcing a change from the 3-litre V10 formula. This replaced the Petronas-badged Ferrari engines which the team had used since 1997. The Sauber team's existing major sponsors, Petronas and Credit Suisse, renewed their contracts with BMW. The team also announced a technical partnership with technology company Intel. The team's new livery, which was maintained throughout its tenure in Formula One, consisted of the traditional BMW blue and white with a hint of red.

Villeneuve scored the team's first points with a seventh-place finish at the Malaysian Grand Prix, after Heidfeld retired from fifth with an engine failure late in the race. Over the first two-thirds of the season the drivers picked up points with a succession of seventh and eighth-place finishes, plus a fourth-place finish for Heidfeld at the Australian Grand Prix. The team ran a radical "twin towers" aero enhancement on the front of the car for the French Grand Prix, which was meant to improve the flow of air over the top of the chassis. The parts were promptly banned by the Fédération Internationale de l'Automobile (FIA) as they were adjudged to impede the drivers' vision and thus compromise safety.

Heidfeld scored the team's first podium finish at the Hungarian Grand Prix from tenth on the grid. This race also saw the début of Robert Kubica, who replaced Villeneuve after the latter had crashed heavily at the preceding German Grand Prix. Kubica finished seventh, although he was later disqualified after his car was found to be underweight. The official reason for Villeneuve's absence was that he was recovering from his previous accident, but the team later announced that the driver change was permanent. Kubica scored BMW Sauber's second podium finish of the season at the Italian Grand Prix, after running in third place for most of the race and leading briefly during the first round of pit stops while Heidfeld finished in eighth.

2007

On 19 October 2006, BMW announced that Robert Kubica would partner Nick Heidfeld for the 2007 Formula One season with Sebastian Vettel taking the test and reserve driver role. Timo Glock was later signed as the team's second test driver. The team launched its 2007 car, the F1.07, on January 16, 2007.

The new car showed promising form throughout winter testing, topping the time sheets on occasions. However, team principal Mario Theissen declared some reliability concerns before the season's opening race in Australia. Kubica retired from fourth place with a gearbox problem, but Heidfeld took over the position and held it to the end of the race. In the early races of the season, Heidfeld and Kubica scored a series of points finishes and established BMW Sauber as the third-fastest team, behind Ferrari and McLaren. Theissen also made the point that the performance gap between BMW Sauber and the two top teams was less than the gap between BMW Sauber and the teams behind it.

The Canadian Grand Prix brought mixed fortunes for the team. While Heidfeld scored BMW Sauber's best result thus far with a second-place finish, Kubica suffered a huge crash that resulted in a long safety car period. The media was initially told Kubica had broken his leg, but it later proved that he had escaped with only a sprained ankle and concussion. Vettel took his place in the United States Grand Prix, finishing in eighth place and therefore becoming the youngest driver to score a Formula One World Championship point. Later in the season, Vettel moved teams to take a race seat at the Toro Rosso team.

Kubica returned to racing action at the French Grand Prix and proved his recovery by finishing in fourth position. Over the remainder of the season, he and Heidfeld continued their form to score a total of 101 points, which secured the team second in the Constructors' Championship after McLaren's disqualification. Heidfeld scored another podium finish at the Hungarian Grand Prix and scored 61 points to Kubica's 39, while Vettel's sole appearance produced an additional point.

2008

On August 21, 2007, BMW confirmed its driver line-up of Heidfeld and Kubica for the  season.
Their 2008 car, the F1.08 was officially launched in Munich at BMW Welt on January 14, 2008. It made its track debut at Valencia the next day, with Robert Kubica driving. Team principal Mario Theissen set the target of the team's first win.

BMW Sauber started the season well with Kubica narrowly missing out on pole after a mistake in his main qualifying lap in Melbourne. He later retired after being hit by Kazuki Nakajima but Heidfeld finished second. Kubica took second in Malaysia, with Heidfeld in 6th setting the fastest lap of the race. The team's points total of 11 was their largest score up to that time. In Bahrain, Kubica scored his and the team's first-ever pole position, beating Felipe Massa by just under three-hundredths of a second. The team went on to finish 3rd and 4th in the race, equalling their highest round points total and promoting them to first place in the constructors' championship for the first time.

The team also attained a second-place finish in the Monaco Grand Prix with Robert Kubica, beating both Ferraris and only trailing the McLaren of Lewis Hamilton by three seconds.

BMW Sauber's first race victory came in the 2008 Canadian Grand Prix, the team achieving a one-two finish with Robert Kubica's first race win and Nick Heidfeld taking second place. The victory came after Lewis Hamilton collided with Kimi Räikkönen in the pitlane, ending the race for both drivers. Kubica was on a different refueling strategy from Heidfeld, who also briefly led the race before securing the one-two finish for BMW Sauber in a comfortable fashion.

After the team's breakthrough win, development was switched to the 2009 season where new regulations come into play. This greatly annoyed Kubica, (who was leading the championship after the Canadian Grand Prix), as he felt they could have had a realistic chance of taking at least one title. The lack of development was reflected with a drop of form throughout the second half of the season, causing BMW to be outpaced by Renault, Toyota, and even Toro Rosso (who started the season as one of the slowest teams) by the end of the season. Despite this, Kubica remained with an outside chance of taking the drivers championship until the Chinese Grand Prix, the 17th round out of 18.

In October the team confirmed that they would stick with Robert Kubica and Nick Heidfeld as their drivers for the  Season.

2009

Although BMW Sauber targeted the  season as the year they would challenge for the title, their start to the season was a disappointment. Kubica was running in 3rd place in the opening round when he collided with Vettel while battling for 2nd place and was forced to retire. Heidfeld then secured the team's first podium of the year in Malaysia, but after 6 races BMW Sauber had collected a mere 6 points, and occupied 8th place in the Constructors' Championship out of 10 teams. A raft of upgrades was set for Turkey, including an improved regenerative braking system (KERS) and a double-deck diffuser. While the new diffuser was implemented, the KERS could not be made to fit the new car and both drivers raced without the device. After the qualifying session for the British Grand Prix Mario Theissen announced that the team had decided to halt further development KERS; of which BMW had been one of the strongest proponents, and focus instead on improving the car's aerodynamics. This left Ferrari and McLaren as the only remaining users of the KERS system. In the European Grand Prix at Valencia Robert Kubica scored the team's first points since the race in Turkey.

Following a meeting of the BMW board on July 28, the company held at press conference the following morning in which it confirmed the team's withdrawal from Formula One at the end of 2009. Chairman Norbert Reithofer described the decision as a strategic one. The Formula One Teams Association released a statement in response pledging its support to help the team remain in F1.

On 15 September 2009, it was announced that BMW Sauber had secured a buyer, Qadbak Investments Limited which said to represent European and Middle Eastern interests. However Lotus had been given the 13th and final slot in the 2010 Championship. The team were awarded what was termed a 14th entry, which hinged either on another team dropping out or all the other teams agreeing to allow 28 cars to enter the 2010 Championship.

On November 22, Swiss newspaper SonntagsZeitung revealed that Qadbak's attempt to purchase the team had failed as it did not have the necessary funds. Qadbak turned out to be a shell company with no assets and no investors behind it. On November 27, 2009, it was announced that Peter Sauber would repurchase the team conditional upon the team receiving a FIA entry for the 2010 season. The FIA subsequently granted Sauber an entry on December 3.

Complete Formula One results
(key)

Formula One World Championship results
11 race wins.
17 pole positions.
62 podium finishes

References

BMW engines
Formula One engines
V10 engines
V8 engines
Gasoline engines by model
Engines by model